Allan Joseph Champneys Cunningham (1842–1928) was a British-Indian mathematician.

Biography
Born in Delhi, Cunningham was the son of Sir Alexander Cunningham, archaeologist and the founder of the Archaeological Survey of India. He started a military career with the East India Company's Bengal Engineers at a young age. From 1871 to 1881, he was instructor in mathematics at the Thomason College of Civil Engineering. Upon returning to the United Kingdom in 1881, he continued teaching at military institutes in Chatham, Dublin and Shorncliffe. He left the army in 1891. He spent the rest of his life studying number theory. He applied his expertise to finding factors of large numbers of the form an ± bn, such as Mersenne numbers and Fermat numbers which have b = 1. His work is continued in the Cunningham project.

References

External links
Number Theory Web, Allan Joseph Champneys Cunningham (based on the obituary by A.E. Western).

1842 births
1928 deaths
People from Delhi
19th-century British mathematicians
20th-century British mathematicians
Number theorists
British East India Company Army officers